Theodore Anthony Rosequist (April 17, 1908 – November 29, 1988) was an American football player and coach. Rosequist played college football at John Carroll University and Ohio State University. He was selected by the International News Service as a third-team tackle on the 1932 College Football All-America Team. He played professional football as a tackle in the National Football League (NFL) for the Chicago Bears (1934–1936) and Cleveland Rams (1937).

Kingsman served as the head football coach at Brooklyn College from 1948 to 1953.

References

External links
 

1908 births
1988 deaths
American football tackles
Brooklyn Kingsmen football coaches
Chicago Bears players
Cleveland Rams players
Ohio State Buckeyes football players
Sportspeople from Cleveland
People from Emlenton, Pennsylvania
Coaches of American football from Ohio
Players of American football from Cleveland